India has over 7,500 km of coastline, including that of the island groups, and this provides many opportune places for surfing. The largest waves are usually seen between May and September, the pre-monsoon and monsoon season. Some of the spots for surfing in India are Mangalore, Manipal, Kapu Beach, Sasihithlu and Murdeshwara in Karnataka, Mahabalipuram, Covelong and Manapad in Tamil Nadu, Kovalam and Varkala in Kerala, Little Andaman and Lakshadweep.

Stand up paddling and surfing as in the current form was not a familiar sport in India until recently. The first competition was held in Mahabalipuram, organised and funded by Temple Adventures and Temple Surfboards in August 2011 and marked the first competitive event for surfing in India. The first surf camp happened in 2011 at Chennai, Tamil Nadu. It was organised by Bay of Life in association with the Surfing Federation of India (SFI); it marked the beginning of surfing as a popular, organised sport in the country. Surfing Federation of India is the governing body for surfing in India. Surfing Federation of India is the governing body for surfing in India.  The state associations are Karnataka Surfing Association (KSA), Orissa Surfing Association (OSA), and Surfing and Water Sports Association of Tamil Nadu (SWAT).

Bay of Life (Chennai, Kovalam)Kallialay Surf School (Pondicherry) Shaka Surf Club (Udupi), Paddle for Future (Chidambaram) Lonely Surfers (Vishakapatnam), Mantra Surf Club (Mangalore), and Soul and Surf Club (Varkala) are some of the accredited surf schools in India, among others.

Top surfing schools in India.

Covelong Point Surf Festival is an annual surfing event held near Surf Turf in Covelong Beach, Chennai. The festival attracts both national and international surfers who compete in various categories such as longboard, shortboard, and stand-up paddleboard. In addition to the surfing competition, the festival also includes music performances, art exhibitions, food stalls, and other activities that celebrate the surfing culture. The festival has become a major tourist attraction, drawing surf enthusiasts and spectators from all over the world.

See also
Ishita Malaviya

References

External links
 Surfing Federation of india

 
India
Water sports in India
Adventure tourism in India